The 2019 FD Senior Division is the top tier football league in the state of Delhi. The season started on Saturday, 10th March 2019.

Format 
16 teams are divided in two groups, comprising 8 teams in group A and 8 teams in group B. Group stage matches will be played in robin round basis. Four teams from each group will qualify for super 8.

Premier League will be played in round robin format. 8 teams will play each other once and league leader will be adjudged the winner. Bottom teams could be relegated to lower division.

Teams 

16 teams took part in the 2021 regular edition of the league:

Group A 

 Indian Air Force FC
 Delhi FC
 Garhwal FC
 National United FC
 Sudeva Delhi FC
 Hindustan FC
 Ahbab FC
 Jaguar FC

Group B 

 Youngmen SC
 City FC
 Tarun Sangha FC
 Delhi United FC
 Shastri FC
 Rangers SC
 Indian National FC
 Friends United FC

Standings

Group stage

Group A

Group B

References 

Football in Delhi
3
2019–20 in Indian football